Riho Breivel (born 26 August 1952, in Kohtla-Järve) is an Estonian politician. He has been member of XIV Riigikogu.

In 2005 he graduated from Tallinn University in organisational behaviour.

2002-2006 he was the director of Estonian Academy of Security Sciences' Border Guard College. 2007-2012 he was Ida-Viru County Governor.

Since 2018 he is a member of Estonian Conservative People's Party.

References

1952 births
Conservative People's Party of Estonia politicians
Living people
Members of the Riigikogu, 2019–2023
People from Kohtla-Järve
Tallinn University alumni